The Pakistan Remote Sensing Satellite (PRSS), commercially known as Remote Sensing Satellite System (RSSS), is a dual-purpose Earth observational and optical satellite. Pakistan Remote Sensing Satellite-1 (PRSS-1) was launched from China's Jiuquan Satellite Centre on 9 July 2018.

History 
After successful launching and operation of Badr satellite programme which contained the experimental Low Earth Observational satellites in the 1990s and early 2000s, SUPARCO launched the work on the high resolution Remote Sensing Satellite to meet the national and international user requirements in the field of satellite imagery.

The PRSS program was planned to be a progressive and sustainable program with an initial plans to launch an optical satellite with payload of 2.5 metre PAN in 700 km sun-synchronous orbit by the end of year 2014, which will be followed by a series of optical and SAR satellites in future. Necessary infrastructure for ground control and image reception and processing is also planned to be set up. The satellites are under development process and they are being developed by SUPARCO.

In 2012, the first remote sensing satellite project was completed. Suparco set up its own version of Global navigation satellite system (GNSS) and immediately acquired the Beidou navigation system of China for this satellite in September 2012.

Three satellites are under design by SUPARCO in collaboration with different universities throughout the country. According to SUPARCO, first satellite of this program was launched in 2018, and it is visioned to provide help in exploiting the potentials of space technologies for natural resource surveying and environmental purpose.

Launch date 
On 9 July 2018 at 03:56:10 UTC, China successfully launched two remote sensing satellites for Pakistan, which were launched to monitor progress as they build the China–Pakistan Economic Corridor, an extensive multibillion-dollar infrastructure development project between the two nations. The satellites were named PRSS-1 and PakTES-1A, and were launched from the Jiuquan Satellite Launch Center in northwest China using a Long March 2C launch vehicle. The PRSS-1 is China's first optical remote sensing satellite sold to Pakistan. It is the 17th satellite developed by the China Academy of Space Technology for an overseas buyer, while PakTES-1A is an experimental satellite of Space & Upper Atmosphere Research Commission (SUPARCO).

References

External links 
 Pakistan to launch remote sensing satellite system
 PRSSS to be Launch
 Pakistan Remote Sensing Satellite
 Pakistan to launch its first Remote Sensing Satellite

2018 in Pakistan
Spacecraft launched in 2018
SUPARCO satellites
Earth observation satellites of Pakistan
Space synthetic aperture radar
Weather satellites of Pakistan